The Montreal General Hospital (MGH) is a hospital in Montreal, Quebec, Canada established in the years 1818–1820. The hospital received its charter in 1823. It is currently part of the McGill University Health Centre (MUHC) and is located on Mount Royal, at the intersection of Pine Avenue (Avenue des Pins) and Côte-des-Neiges Road. It has six pavilions: A, B, C, D, E and Livingston (L); plus a research centre in a separate building next to the L pavilion.

The first MGH was built at the corner of Craig Street (today St. Antoine) and St. Lawrence Boulevard and only had 24 beds. Having outgrown this space, it moved to a new 72-bed building on Dorchester Boulevard (now René-Lévesque) at St. Dominique Street; today this facility is a long-term care centre. In 1924, the hospital merged with the Western General Hospital (currently the D & E wings of the former Montreal Children's Hospital) building at the corner of Tupper Street and Atwater Avenue. The current location was opened on October 4th, 1955 by Mary, Princess Royal and Countess of Harewood. 

The MGH has been designated by the Quebec government as one of three Level I trauma centres in the province, (the others being the Hôpital du Sacré-Cœur de Montréal and Hôpital de l'Enfant-Jésus in Quebec City).

The MGH has been affiliated with McGill since 1832 and was one of the first teaching hospitals.

In 2019, Newsweek ranked the hospital 6th in Canada and 2nd in Quebec

History
Fund-raising to establish an English hospital in Montreal was undertaken in the years 1818-1820. The growing needs of the English-speaking population led to several charities, among them the Female Benevolent Society of Montreal and the Society for the Relief of Immigrants, to ask for help in building a new hospital. At this time, Montreal had two hospitals: the Grey Nuns' Hopital General and the Hôtel-Dieu de Montréal).

In 1819 enough money had been received to lease a building on Craig Street to accommodate 24 patients and this small hospital opened on May 1, 1819. By 1820 enough money had been subscribed to purchase property on Dorchester and St Dominique streets. The cornerstone of the new Montreal General Hospital was laid in 1821 and the 72-bed hospital building opened in 1822. The hospital received its first charter in 1823.

At the same time four Edinburgh-trained physicians Andrew Fernando Holmes, William Robertson, William Caldwell and John Stephenson were working to establish medical teaching in Montreal. They founded the Montreal Medical Institution in 1823 as a teaching unit of the hospital. In 1829 the Institution became part of McGill University, then known as McGill College. It was McGill's first faculty and Canada's first faculty of medicine.

On May 30, 1955, the Montreal General Hospital moved to its present location near Mount Royal on Cedar Avenue, at the corner of Côte-des-Neiges Road and one block north of Pine Avenue.

Notable physicians
 Carl Goresky, his theoretical treatment of the transport of substances through intact organs led the basis for the understanding of events within the microvasculature
 Phil Gold, a physician and scientist. In 1968, he co-discovered with Samuel O. Freedman the carcinoembryonic antigen (CEA), which resulted in a blood test used in the diagnosis and management of people with cancer.
 Albert Moll, a psychiatrist who pioneered the day treatment of psychiatric patients.
 David Mulder, a physician and surgeon committed to the field of trauma and known as the primary physician for the Montreal Canadiens
 Ouida Ramón-Moliner, a anaesthetist who assisted Wilder Penfield perform awake crainotomies by keeping patients awake to locate where exactly there were suffering from epilepsy.

Images

See also
 Centre hospitalier universitaire de Montréal (CHUM)
 Hôpital du Sacré-Cœur de Montréal
 Dawson College shooting
 Jewish General Hospital
 McGill University Health Centre
 McGill University Faculty of Medicine
 Montreal Chest Institute
 Montreal Children's Hospital
 Montreal Neurological Institute
 Royal Victoria Hospital

References

External links
 Historical information

Hospitals in Montreal
Hospital buildings completed in 1955
Hospitals established in 1819
Ville-Marie, Montreal
1820 establishments in Lower Canada
Physicians of Montreal General Hospital
McGill University buildings